Matjikinyane Nkosinathi 'Jixie' Molapo (born 2 January 1995) is a South African professional rugby union player, who most recently played with the . His usually plays as a right winger.

Career

Youth

He played for them as early as primary school level, when he was included in their squad that played at the Under-13 Craven Week tournament in 2008.

At high school level, he played at the Under-16 Grant Khomo Week held in Queenstown in 2011 and at the premier South African schools tournament, the Under-18 Craven Week, held in Port Elizabeth in 2012. He started all three of their matches, scoring a try in their 68–21 victory over Zimbabwe and another in their 20–7 victory over Border during the tournament. At the conclusion of the tournament, he was also selected in the South Africa Schools squad. He made one appearance for them during the 2012 Under-18 International Series, starting the match against Wales and scoring a try in a 24–16 victory.

He was again selected to represent Limpopo in the 2013 Craven Week tournament which was held in Polokwane and scored a try in their 36–39 loss to Eastern Province Country Districts in the final of his three starts at the tournament.

He was included in the  squad that played in the 2014 Under-19 Provincial Championship. He helped his side finish top of the log after the regular season to qualify for the semi-finals. He started their semi-final match against  and scored one of six tries in a 43–20 victory. He also started the final against  in Cape Town, but ended the match on the losing side as the hosts ran out 33–26 winners.

Molapo was included in the Blue Bulls squad for the 2015 Vodacom Cup, but was not selected in any matchday squad during the competition. He played in for the  team in the 2015 Under-21 Provincial Championship Group A, starting their first six matches of the competition.

Eastern Province Kings

Serious financial problems at the Port Elizabeth-based side saw a number of first team regulars leave the union and Molapo was among a number of youngsters that were included in their squad that competed in the 2016 Currie Cup qualification series.

References

South African rugby union players
Living people
1995 births
Middelburg
Rugby union wings
Blue Bulls players
Eastern Province Elephants players
Rugby union players from Mpumalanga